Severe Tropical Storm Kompasu, known in the Philippines as Severe Tropical Storm Maring was a very large and deadly tropical cyclone that affected the Philippines, Taiwan, and southeast China. Part of the 2021 Pacific typhoon season, Kompasu originated from an area of low pressure east of the Philippines on 6 October 2021. The Japan Meteorological Agency (JMA) classified it as a tropical depression that day. A day later, the Philippine Atmospheric, Geophysical and Astronomical Services Administration  (PAGASA) classified it as a tropical depression, naming it Maring. The cyclone was initially heavily disorganised, competing with another vortex, Tropical Depression Nando. Eventually, Maring became dominant, and the JMA reclassified it as a tropical storm, naming it Kompasu. Kompasu made landfall in Cagayan, Philippines, on 11 October 2021, and two days later, the storm made landfall in Hainan, China. The cyclone dissipated on 14 October 2021 while located over Vietnam.

According to the National Disaster Risk Reduction and Management Council (NDRRMC), 43 people died from the storm in the Philippines, with 17 missing. Damage is estimated at ₱6.4 billion (US$127 million). In Hong Kong, one person died and 21 people were injured. The storm impacted many areas previously affected by Tropical Storm Lionrock a few days prior. According to Aon Benfield, economic losses outside the Philippines totaled US$118 million, with a grand total of US$245 million in economic losses.

Meteorological history

At 18:00 UTC (Coordinated Universal Time) on 6 October 2021, the JMA noted that an area of low pressure embedded within a large monsoonal circulation had formed to the north of Palau. The system developed into a tropical depression at 00:00 UTC of the next day. At 09:00 UTC (17:00 PHT) on 7 October, PAGASA issued its first bulletin for the depression, and assigned it the name Maring. The JMA also noted the persistence of another, nearby tropical depression to its Northeast, later named Nando. As it is embedded in the same monsoonal depression and due to its proximity, Nando began to merge with Maring, and therefore formed a very broad and large circulation at a diameter of 1900 km, beating Lekima of 2007 by 200 km. This prompted the JMA to upgrade the overall system to a tropical storm, and was named Kompasu. However at that time, the JTWC still considered the system as two separate disturbances and issued separate TCFAs later in the day for both depressions, albeit noting the possibility of merging. The JTWC later considered the entire system as merged with their first warning for Kompasu. At midnight of 11 October, the JMA upgraded it to a severe tropical storm, as it attained good cloud characteristics. At 12:10 UTC (20:10 PHT) on 11 October, Kompasu made landfall on Fuga Island, Cagayan, as a severe tropical storm. At 05:00 PHT of 13 October (21:00 UTC of 12 October), the PAGASA issued its final bulletin as its exited the PAR and continued towards Hainan. Between 03:00 and 09:00 UTC of 13 October, Kompasu had made landfall over the east coast of Hainan. By 18:00 UTC, the JMA downgraded it to a tropical storm, as it crossed the entire island and entered the Gulf of Tonkin, as its convection had rapidly weakened because of the rough terrain of the island. At 09:00 UTC of the next day, the JTWC issued its final warning followed by downgrading to a tropical depression, as its convection had diminished and the low-level circulation center had been weakened significantly because of the increasing vertical wind shear and dry air, despite not making landfall over northern Vietnam. The JMA issued its final warning after downgrading it to a tropical depression at 18:00 UTC.

Preparations and impact

Philippines

Around 2,000 people were evacuated as a precaution. On 12 October 2021, the governments of Baguio, Ilocos Sur, and Pangasinan cancelled school and suspended work in government offices. According to the National Disaster Risk Reduction and Management Council (NDRRMC), the storm affected more than 567,062 people in the Ilocos Region, Cagayan Valley, Mimaropa, Central Luzon and Cordillera Administrative Region in Luzon, as well as Caraga in Mindanao. Metro Manila, the national capital region, was also affected. The Department of Public Works and Highways reported that 15 national roads and highways nationwide were impassable due to flooding attributed to Maring (Kompasu) and Tropical Depression Nando. The NDRRMC reported that a total of 40 people died and 17 people are still missing. Five people were injured. Of the dead, nine people died in landslides in Benguet and five died in flash floods in Palawan. In La Trinidad, Benguet, three children died after a mudslide buried their home. In Cagayan, power outages were reported. Around 200 people were evacuated. Two people died after getting washed away by floodwaters, and ten people were rescued from flooded homes. The Office of the Vice-president dispatched two squads to help those who were affected by the storm in the provinces of La Union, Cagayan, Isabela, and Benguet. According to the NDRRMC, damage is estimated at ₱3.85 billion (US$75.7 million). The government of the Philippines also distributed ₱17.94 million (US$353,418) worth of recovery items to people affected by the storm.

China
On 13 October 2021, heavy rains affected Zhejiang, Fujian, Guangdong, and Hainan provinces. In Guangdong, a total of 30 cities and counties suspended classes, the highest since Typhoon Mangkhut in 2018. Heavy rain lashed Shenzhen, where construction sites and tourist attractions were shut down. The Yantian Port, one of the world's busiest ports, was closed, causing a maritime traffic jam.

Hong Kong
The Hong Kong Observatory (HKO) issued the No. 8 Gale or Storm Signal during the approach of Kompasu, and kept it in force for over 23 hours. This was the longest No. 8 Signal ever recorded, beating the record of Tropical Storm Lionrock three days prior. Gale-force winds of over 70 km/h were generally recorded over the coastal areas, with gusts exceeding  in some areas. The government opened 24 shelters, to which 255 people fled during the storm. There were 72 reports of fallen trees, and 10 reports of flooding. One person died, and 21 people were injured.

Hainan
Authorities in Hainan closed three ports, and all schools were closed in Haikou. Trees were brought down in Hainan, with firefighters clearing debris from roads. The storm was the strongest to hit the island in five years.

Elsewhere
The Central Weather Bureau issued advisories for heavy rain for northern and eastern parts of Taiwan. Heavy rain was reported in numerous areas, including the Taipei–Keelung metropolitan area. The Thai Meteorological Department had issued heavy rain forecasts for the country's upper Isan region, but the rains eased off as the storm rapidly lost strength following its landfall in Vietnam.

Retirement 
After the season, PAGASA announced that the name Maring would be removed from its list of typhoon names after it caused ₱1 billion in damages and will no longer be used in the future. On 21 March 2022, the PAGASA chose the name Mirasol as its replacement for the 2025 season.

See also
 Weather of 2021
 Tropical cyclones in 2021
 Other tropical cyclones named Maring
 Other tropical cyclones named Kompasu
 Typhoon Damrey (2005) – a tropical cyclone that took a similar path in late September 2005
Tropical Storm Nock-ten (2011) - A  storm with a similar track
 Typhoon Kalmaegi (2014) – another large tropical cyclone that also took a similar track in September 2014
 Tropical Storm Son-Tinh (2018) – took a similar track and affected the Philippines, South China and Vietnam in July 2018
 Tropical Storm Nangka (2020) – made landfall in Hainan and Vietnam a year prior with similar intensity

References

External links

 JMA General Information of Severe Tropical Storm Kompasu (2118) from Digital Typhoon
 JMA Best Track Data of Severe Tropical Storm Kompasu (2118) 
 JMA Best Track Data (Graphics) of Severe Tropical Storm Lionrock (2117)
 JTWC Best Track Data of Tropical Storm 25W (Kompasu)
 25W.KOMPASU from the U.S. Naval Research Laboratory

2021 disasters in the Philippines
2021 Pacific typhoon season
October 2021 events in Asia
October 2021 events in the Philippines
Kompasu
Typhoons in the Philippines
Kompasu